Mohammed Afzal Khan,  (born 5 April 1958) is a Pakistani born British Labour Party politician serving as the Member of Parliament (MP) for Manchester Gorton since 2017.

He was formerly Lord Mayor of Manchester for the year 2005–2006, and served as a Member of the European Parliament (MEP) for North West England from 2014 to 2017.

Early life
Khan was born in Pakistan and came to the UK aged 11.  After leaving school without qualifications, he had a number of jobs, including as a Greater Manchester Police constable, before returning to education and qualifying as a solicitor.

Political career

Local government
Khan was first elected a Labour Councillor in 2000, being re-elected in 2004, 2007 and 2011, representing Cheetham Ward. He served as Executive Member for Children's Services.

Khan became the first Muslim Lord Mayor of Manchester, taking the position for 2005–2006.

In 2010, Khan was appointed CBE for his race relations work.

In 2011, Khan was suggested as a candidate for Oldham East and Saddleworth. In 2012, he was a potential candidate for the Bradford West by-election but lost the nomination to Imran Hussain, who was defeated by Respect Party candidate, George Galloway.

European Parliament
Khan was selected in February 2013 on the Labour Party's list for North West England at the European Parliamentary election of 2014 and, on 22 May 2014, he was returned as MEP to the European Parliament to represent North West England.

In January 2016, Khan was appointed by the Progressive Alliance of Socialists and Democrats in the European Parliament as Special Representative to Muslim Communities. In this function, Khan visited Germany, the United Kingdom, Italy, France and Denmark for work with local Muslim communities and invited groups of young Muslims to the Parliament.

Parliamentary career
In March 2017, he applied to be Labour's candidate in the 2017 Manchester Gorton by-election and was officially selected on 22 March. During the by-election, he said "I condemn the statements made by Ken Livingstone and I believe there is no place for anti-Semitism in the Labour Party." He added, "I have been a lifelong campaigner against racism and anti-Semitism. In 2008, I was awarded a CBE in part for my work encouraging greater understanding between Muslims and Jews. I intend to continue this work if I am elected as MP for Manchester Gorton."

The by-election was cancelled following the dissolution of Parliament for the early general election on 8 June 2017. Khan was again selected for as the Labour candidate for the general election and was elected, becoming Manchester's first Muslim MP. In July 2017, Khan was appointed Shadow Immigration Minister.

In July 2019, Khan apologised for having shared on Facebook two years earlier a video of American comedian Jon Stewart talking about Benjamin Netanyahu. The text under the video referred to an "Israel-British-Swiss-Rothschilds crime syndicate" and "mass murdering Rothschilds Israeli mafia criminal liars". Khan said he was "mortified", adding "I didn't read the text below, which contained an anti-Semitic conspiracy about the Rothschilds. I would never have shared it if I had seen that".

Other roles
From 2000 to 2004, Khan was a member of the Department of Trade and Industry's Ethnic Minority Business Forum, advising the then Secretary of State, Patricia Hewitt.

Following the 2005 London bombings, he became a member of a Home Office working group aimed at preventing extremism.

He has also served as Assistant Secretary-General of the Muslim Council of Britain and is its North West representative.

He is a co-founder of the Muslim Jewish Forum of Greater Manchester.

Khan has appeared on Channel M documentaries.

He was appointed as parliamentary chair for the Labour Muslim Network in August 2020.

Other events
In March 2018, Khan received a suspicious package containing an anti-Islamic letter and sticky liquid. The substance was later found to be harmless. Similar packages were received by fellow Labour MPs Mohammad Yasin, Rushanara Ali and Rupa Huq.

Personal life
Khan's daughter, Maryam Khan, was a Councillor on Manchester City Council, for Longsight.

See also
List of British Pakistanis
Labour Friends of Palestine & the Middle East

References

External links

1958 births
Greater Manchester Police officers
British politicians of Pakistani descent
British solicitors
Commanders of the Order of the British Empire
Councillors in Manchester
Labour Friends of Palestine and the Middle East
Labour Party (UK) councillors
Labour Party (UK) MEPs
Labour Party (UK) MPs for English constituencies
Living people
Lord Mayors of Manchester
MEPs for England 2014–2019
Pakistani emigrants to the United Kingdom
Politicians from Jhelum
UK MPs 2017–2019
UK MPs 2019–present